Lovejoy High School (LHS) is a public high school in Hampton, Georgia, United States. It is the southernmost secondary school in Clayton County.

Lovejoy is a part of the Clayton County Public Schools. Middle schools generally associated with Lovejoy High are Lovejoy Middle School, Mundy's Mill Middle School and Eddie White Academy. Lovejoy High School is one of two International Baccalaureate Organization-accredited schools in Clayton County.

Clayton State University is the nearest post-secondary school, though some college-bound students enroll at the University of Georgia, Georgia Southern University, University of West Georgia, Georgia Gwinnett College and Georgia State University.

Lovejoy High School offers a variety of sports, including football, basketball, tennis, golf, baseball, track, and soccer. The school's teams are known as the Wildcats.

Extracurricular activities
 AFJROTC
 FCA (Fellowship of Christian Athletes)
 Future Business Leaders of America
 Marching band
 Technology Student Association
 2008 - State Champion
 2007 - State Champion
 2006 - Runner-up
 2005 - Second Runner-up
 1997 - State Champion
 1995 - Runner-up
 Mock Trial
 Odyssey of the Mind
 1994 - World Champion
 1994 - National Champion
 1994 - State Champion
 Office Aide (seniors only)
 Orchestra
 2018 Georgia AAAAAA State Champions Girls Basketball
 2022 GHSA AAAAAA State Champions Girls Basketball
 2022 - Chinese Club *(Founded by Jordan Ward & Antoinette Robinson)

Notable alumni
 Tashard Choice - former running back for the Buffalo Bills
 Mario Fannin - former running back for the Denver Broncos
 DeMarquis Gates - linebacker for the Minnesota Vikings
 Mike Lenzly - shooting guard for Great Britain men's national basketball team
 Latto - Rapper and Winner of The Rap Game season 1
 Derrick Peterson - Olympian, track and field, 800m, 2004
 Chris Scott - former professional football player
 Michael Tolcher - indie rock/alternative singer
 Antwione Williams - former professional football player
 Cheyna Williams - professional soccer player
 Preston Williams- wide receiver for the Miami Dolphins

References

1989 establishments in Georgia (U.S. state)
Educational institutions established in 1989
Public high schools in Georgia (U.S. state)
Schools in Clayton County, Georgia